As-Safena is a small village of approximately 1,584 people in the western Ajloun region of north Jordan.  It is located in a remote, mountainous area about 10 km from the city of Ajloun.  Safena comes from the Arabic word for ship, because the mountain the village stands on looks like a ship.  The main sources of income are generally from jobs with the military or agriculture.  The village consists of the Zreigat and the Ananza families.

History
The Jordanian census of 1961 found 183 inhabitants in Safina.

Education
As-Safena has three schools. The As-Safena Secondary School for Girls was built in 1998.  It currently serves 150 females in grades 5th – Tawjihi and 50 students in Kindergarten.  The As-Safena Secondary School for Boys serves males in grades 5th-Tawjihi, while the newly built As-Safena Primary School serves boys and girls grades 1st-4th.

References

Bibliography

Populated places in Ajloun Governorate